The Nokia 6600 slide is a mobile phone series by Nokia. It includes the original 6600 slide (released April 2008) and the updated 6600i slide (released May 2009). The phone runs the Series 40 5th edition platform, including Feature Pack 1. This is the slide version of updated Nokia 6600 series.

Common features

Browsing
xHTML browser over wTCP/IP stack supports WAP release 2.0
WML (WAP 2.0) browser
Communications
Quad band GSM / GPRS / EDGE: GSM 850, GSM 900, GSM 1800, GSM 1900
 Dual band UMTS: UMTS 850, UMTS 2100
Developer Platform
Series 40 5th Edition, Feature Pack 1
Display
2.2" (240x320 pixels) QVGA display supporting up to 16.7 million colors 
Media
Music player supports MP3, MP4, AAC, eAAC+ & WMA audio formats
Video playback supports H.263, H.264, MPEG4, and 3GPP formats and codecs
Video streaming supports 3GPP and H.263 formats
FM Radio
Double LED flash
Video Recording supports VGA at 15fps, and QVGA at 30fps
Connectivity
Micro USB 2.0 supporting USB On-The-Go
Remote SyncML data synchronisation via Bluetooth

Specific features

Nokia 6600

Camera
3.2-megapixel (2048x1536 resolution) camera, with 8x digital zoom
second camera
Dimensions
90 x 45 x 14mm
Memory
20 MB internal memory expandable to 4 GB using microSD card
Power Management
BL-4U Battery
Up to 4 hours talk time on GSM, and 3 hours on WCDMA
Up to 10 days standby time
1000 mAh

Nokia 6600i

Camera
5-megapixel (2592x1944 resolution) camera, with 8x digital zoom
second camera
Dimensions
90 x 45 x 14.2mm
Memory
20 MB internal memory expandable to 16 GB using microSD card
Power Management
BL-4U Battery
Up to 4 hours talk time on GSM, and 3 hours on WCDMA
Up to 12 days standby time
1000 mAh

Related handsets
 Nokia 3600 slide
 Nokia 6500 slide
 Nokia 6600 fold

References

External links
 Nokia 6600 slide
 Nokia 6600i slide
 Nokia 6600 slide review

6600
Slider phones
Mobile phones introduced in 2008